The government of Gauteng province in South Africa consists of a unicameral legislature elected by proportional representation, and an executive branch headed by a Premier who is elected by the legislature.

Legislature

The provincial legislature is a unicameral body of 73 members elected by a system of party-list proportional representation. The legislature is elected for a term of five years, unless it is dissolved early. By convention elections to the provincial legislature are held at the same time as elections to the National Assembly. The legislature meets in the Johannesburg City Hall.

The most recent elections were held on 8 May 2019, and were won by the African National Congress (ANC) which obtained 37 of the 73 seats on the legislature. The composition of the legislature is as follows:

|-style="background:#e9e9e9;"
!colspan="2" style="text-align:left"| Party !! style="text-align:center"| Seats 
|-
|  || 37 
|-
|  || 20 
|-
|  || 11 
|-
|  || 3 
|-
|  || 1
|-
|  || 1 
|-
|colspan="2" style="text-align:left"| Total || style="text-align:right"| 73 
|}

Executive

The head of the provincial executive is the Premier of Gauteng, who is a member of the provincial legislature elected by the legislature. The Premier appoints an Executive Council who are a cabinet overseeing the executive departments.

 the Premier is Panyaza Lesufi of the ANC, and the ten members of the Executive Council are listed in the following table.

Courts

South Africa has a single national court system and the provinces do not have their own courts. The Gauteng Division of the High Court of South Africa, which has seats in Pretoria and Johannesburg, has jurisdiction over all cases arising in the province. However, most cases are first heard in one of the over 25 district magistrates' courts or in the regional magistrate's court for the province. Appeals from the magistrates' courts are to the High Court, and appeals from the High Court are to the Supreme Court of Appeal or the Constitutional Court.

Administrative divisions

Gauteng is divided into three metropolitan municipalities and two district municipalities. The district municipalities are in turn divided into a total of seven local municipalities. These municipalities are:
 City of Johannesburg Metropolitan Municipality
 City of Tshwane Metropolitan Municipality
 Ekurhuleni Metropolitan Municipality
 Sedibeng District Municipality, consisting of Emfuleni Local Municipality, Lesedi Local Municipality and Midvaal Local Municipality
 West Rand District Municipality, consisting of Merafong City Local Municipality, Mogale City Local Municipality,  and Rand West City Local Municipality.

See also
 Government of South Africa
 Provincial governments of South Africa
 Politics of Gauteng

References

External links
 Gauteng Government
 Gauteng Provincial Legislature

 
Gauteng